George Loyd Courthope, 1st Baron Courthope,  (12 June 1877 – 2 September 1955), known as Sir George Courthope, Bt, from 1925 to 1945, was a British Conservative Party politician.

Background and education
The member of a family that had been settled at Whiligh in Sussex for many centuries, Courthope was the son of Lieutenant-Colonel George John Courthope and his wife Elinor Sarah, daughter of Lieutenant-Colonel Edward Loyd. He was educated at Eton and Christ Church, Oxford and was later called to the Bar, Inner Temple.

Political career
He was elected as the Member of Parliament (MP) for Rye in the 1906 general election, a seat he held until 1945. He never held ministerial office but was sworn of the Privy Council in 1937. He was also a Colonel in the 5th Battalion of the Royal Sussex Regiment (Territorial Army) and fought in the First World War, where he was wounded, mentioned in despatches and awarded the Military Cross. Courthope was created a Baronet, of Whiligh in the County of Sussex, in 1925, and in 1945 he was raised to the peerage as Baron Courthope, of Whiligh in the County of Sussex.

Family
Lord Courthope married firstly Hilda Gertrude, daughter of Major-General Henry Pelham Close, in 1899. They had two daughters. After her death in 1940 he married secondly Margaret, daughter of Frederick Barry, in 1944.  Lord Courthope died in September 1955, aged 78. As he had no male issue the baronetcy and barony became extinct.

Westminster Hall oaks
George Courthope took a particular interest in forestry, being at sometime President of the Royal English Arboricultural Society, and Chairman of the Empire Forestry Association and of the Forestry Commission's Consultative Committee for England. He famously supplied oak wood for the repair of the 14th-century roof of Westminster Hall, some cut from trees over 600 years old, from the same forest in Whiligh, Sussex, which had supplied some of the original timber in 1393.

Arms

References

External links 
 
 

1877 births
1955 deaths
Alumni of Christ Church, Oxford
Members of the Inner Temple
Members of the Privy Council of the United Kingdom
Members of the Parliament of the United Kingdom for English constituencies
People educated at Eton College
People educated at Summer Fields School
Recipients of the Military Cross
Deputy Lieutenants of Sussex
English justices of the peace
UK MPs 1906–1910
UK MPs 1910
UK MPs 1910–1918
UK MPs 1918–1922
UK MPs 1922–1923
UK MPs 1923–1924
UK MPs 1924–1929
UK MPs 1929–1931
UK MPs 1931–1935
UK MPs 1935–1945
UK MPs who were granted peerages
Royal Sussex Regiment officers
British Army personnel of World War I
Barons created by George VI